Tsiweyenki, also known as Gloria Elizeche, (born c. 1951) is the leader of the indigenous Maká people in Paraguay, and the widow of their former leader, Andrés Chemei.

See also
Culture of Paraguay

References

Living people
1950s births
Indigenous people in Paraguay
20th-century Paraguayan women
21st-century Paraguayan women